Samuel Holberry (18 November 1814 – 21 June 1842) was a prominent Chartist activist.

Early years
Holberry was born in Gamston, Nottinghamshire, the youngest of 9 children. In 1832 he joined the British army, leaving in 1835 and moving to Sheffield, where began working as a distiller, and married Mary Cooper (22 October 1838).

Together with other activists campaigning to extend the political rights given by the Reform Act 1832, he engaged in a number of peaceful protests.  After a rebellion in Newport, Monmouthshire now known as the Newport Rising was put down in 1839, then Samuel and a group of conspirators planned a Sheffield Rising.

Radical Chartism
The groups began to organise a militia, and supposedly "provided themselves with arms, and fixed upon a plan for taking some, and firing other parts of the town. That they had agreed to strike down every policeman and watchman that they might meet, and catch the soldiers before they could fire upon them. The barracks were to be fired, and the insurgents were to possess themselves of the Town Hall and Tontine, which they were to defend with the barricades."

The plot was exposed by the landlord of a pub in Rotherham who had infiltrated the group.  Leaders were identified, and both Samuel and Mary were arrested.  In contrast to many members of the group, Samuel freely admitted that he had aimed to upset the Government and was willing to die for the Charter.  He was convicted of conspiracy to riot and sedition and was sentenced to four years' imprisonment.  Placed in Northallerton House of Correction, he was illegally put on the treadwheel.

Death in prison
In gaol, Samuel developed consumption and died after being transferred to York Castle.  He was buried in Sheffield General Cemetery, 50,000 people attending his funeral.

Commemoration

In the 1980s, Sheffield City Council commemorated Holberry by naming a fountain in the Peace Gardens for him.  This was removed during renovations and replaced by the "Holberry Cascades".

References

External links
 www.thepeoplescharter.co.uk
Sheffield General Cemetery: Samuel Holberry
Sheffield Chartists
Political prisoners 1841
Sheffield City Council: Special Features - The Holberry Cascades
BBC - South Yorkshire Sense of Place: Frightful Farewells....

1816 births
1842 deaths
Chartists
Politics of Sheffield
Burials at Sheffield General Cemetery
People from Bassetlaw District